Cladonia gracilis or the smooth cup lichen is a species of fruticose, cup lichen in the family Cladoniaceae. It was first described as a new species by  Carl Linnaeus in his 1753 work Species Plantarum. German botanist Carl Ludwig Willdenow transferred it to the genus Cladonia in 1787. In North America, it is known colloquially as the "smooth Cladonia".

The Cladonia gracilis group is a monophyletic group of species that all are morphologically similar to C. gracilis. In this group, the delimitations of species is difficult due to the morphological similarity between taxa, and the fact that many of the characters used to classify species are influenced by environmental factors such as light exposure, temperature or humidity.

See also
 List of Cladonia species

References

gracilis
Lichen species
Lichens of North America
Lichens described in 1753
Taxa named by Carl Linnaeus